The Guarded Command Language (GCL) is a programming language defined by Edsger Dijkstra for predicate transformer semantics in EWD472. It combines programming concepts in a compact way. It makes it easier to develop a program and its proof hand-in-hand, with the proof ideas leading the way; moreover, parts of a program can actually be calculated.

An important property of GCL is nondeterminism. For example, in the if-statement, several alternatives may be true, and the choice of which to choose is done at runtime, when the if-statement is executed. This frees the programmer from having to make unnecessary choices and is an aid in the formal development of programs.

GCL includes the multiple assignment statement. For example, execution of the statement  is done by first evaluating the righthand side values and then storing them in the lefthand variables.

The following books discuss the development of programs using GCL:

Guarded command
The guarded command is the most important element of the guarded command language. In a guarded command, just as the name says, the command is "guarded". The guard is a proposition, which must be true before the statement is executed. At the start of that statement's execution, one may assume the guard to be true. Also, if the guard is false, the statement will not be executed. The use of guarded commands makes it easier to prove the program meets the specification. The statement is often another guarded command.

Syntax
A guarded command is a statement of the form G → S, where
 G is a proposition, called the guard
 S is a statement

Semantics
At the moment G is encountered in a calculation, it is evaluated.
 If G is true, execute S
 If G is false, look at the context to decide what to do (in any case, do not execute S)

skip and abort
skip and abort are important statements in the guarded command language. abort is the undefined instruction: do anything. It does not even need to terminate. It is used to describe the program when formulating a proof, in which case the proof usually fails. skip is the empty instruction: do nothing. It is used in the program itself, when the syntax requires a statement but the state should not change.

Syntax
 skip

 abort

Semantics
 skip: do nothing
 abort: do anything

Assignment
Assigns values to variables.

Syntax
 v := E
or
 v, v, ..., v := E, E, ..., E

where
 v are program variables
 E are expressions of the same data type as their corresponding variables

Catenation
Statements are separated by one semicolon

Selection: if

The selection (often called the "conditional statement" or "if statement") is a list of guarded commands, of which one is chosen to execute. If more than one guard is true, one statement whose guard is true is nondeterministically chosen to be executed. If no guard is true, the result is undefined. Because at least one of the guards must be true, the empty statement skip is often needed. The statement if fi has no guarded commands, so there is never a true guard. Hence, if fi is equivalent to abort.

Syntax
 if G0 → S0
  □ G1 → S1
 ...
  □ Gn → Sn
 fi

Semantics
Upon execution of a selection all guards are evaluated. If none of the guards evaluates to true then execution of the selection aborts, otherwise one of the guards that has the value true is chosen non-deterministically and the corresponding statement is executed.

Examples

Simple
In pseudocode:
 if a < b then set c to True
 else set c to False

In guarded command language:
 if a < b → c := true
  □ a ≥ b → c := false
 fi

Use of skip
In pseudocode:
 if error is True then set x to 0

In guarded command language:
 if error → x := 0
  □ error → skip
 fi

If the second guard is omitted and error is False, the result is abort.

More guards true
 if a ≥ b → max := a
  □ b ≥ a → max := b
 fi

If a = b, either a or b is chosen as the new value for the maximum, with equal results. However, the implementation may find that one is easier or faster than the other. Since there is no difference to the programmer, any implementation will do.

Repetition: do
Execution of this repetition, or loop, is shown below.

Syntax
 do G0 → S0
  □ G1 → S1
 ...
  □ Gn → Sn
 od

Semantics
Execution of the repetition consists of executing 0 or more iterations, where an iteration consists of (nondeterministically) choosing a guarded command  whose guard  evaluates to true and executing the command . Thus, if all guards are initially false, the repetition terminates immediately, without executing an iteration. Execution of the repetition do od, which has no guarded commands, executes 0 iterations, so do od is equivalent to skip.

Examples

Original Euclidean algorithm
 a, b := A, B;
 do a < b → b := b - a
  □ b < a → a := a - b
 od

This repetition ends when a = b, in which case a and b hold the greatest common divisor of A and B.

Dijkstra sees in this algorithm a way of synchronizing two infinite cycles a := a - b and b := b - a in such a way that a≥0 and b≥0 remains true.

Extended Euclidean algorithm
 a, b, x, y, u, v := A, B, 1, 0, 0, 1;
 do b ≠ 0 →
    q, r := a div b, a mod b;
    a, b, x, y, u, v := b, r, u, v, x - q*u, y - q*v
 od

This repetition ends when b = 0, in which case the variables hold the solution to Bézout's identity: xA + yB = gcd(A,B) .

Non-deterministic sort
 do a>b → a, b := b, a
  □ b>c → b, c := c, b
  □ c>d → c, d := d, c
 od

The program keeps on permuting elements while one of them is greater than its successor. This non-deterministic bubble sort is not more efficient than its deterministic version, but easier to proof: it will not stop while the elements are not sorted and that each step it sorts at least 2 elements.

Arg max
 x, y = 1, 1;
 do x≠n →
    if f(x) ≤ f(y) → x := x+1
     □ f(x) ≥ f(y) → y := x; x := x+1
    fi
 od

This algorithm finds the value 1 ≤ y ≤ n for which a given integer function f is maximal. Not only the computation but also the final state is not necessarily uniquely determined.

Applications

Programs correct by construction 

Generalizing the observational congruence of Guarded Commands into a lattice has led to Refinement Calculus. This has been mechanized in Formal Methods like B-Method that allow one to formally derive programs from their specifications.

Asynchronous circuits 

Guarded commands are suitable for quasi-delay-insensitive circuit design because the repetition
allows arbitrary relative delays for the selection of different commands. In this application,
a logic gate driving a node y in the circuit consists of two guarded commands, as follows:

 PullDownGuard → y := 0
 PullUpGuard → y := 1

PullDownGuard and PullUpGuard here are functions of the logic gate's inputs,
which describe when the gate pulls the output down or up, respectively. Unlike classical
circuit evaluation models, the repetition for a set of guarded commands (corresponding to an asynchronous circuit) can accurately describe all possible dynamic behaviors of that circuit.
Depending on the model one is willing to live with for the electrical circuit elements,
additional restrictions on the guarded commands may be necessary for a guarded-command description
to be entirely satisfactory. Common restrictions include stability, non-interference, and absence
of self-invalidating commands.

Model checking 
Guarded commands are used within the Promela programming language, which is used by the SPIN model checker.  SPIN verifies correct operation of concurrent software applications.

Other 
The Perl module Commands::Guarded implements a deterministic, rectifying variant on Dijkstra's guarded commands.

References 

Logic programming
Edsger W. Dijkstra